Bouzid Mahiouz (born 13 January 1952) is a former Algerian international footballer. He played as a right back. He represented Algeria in the 1980 Summer Olympics.

References

External links
Bouzid Mahyouz FIFA Record at fifa.com

1952 births
Living people
Algerian footballers
Algeria international footballers
Olympic footballers of Algeria
Footballers at the 1980 Summer Olympics
MC Alger players
1980 African Cup of Nations players
Footballers from Algiers
Association football defenders
21st-century Algerian people
African Games gold medalists for Algeria
African Games medalists in football
Competitors at the 1978 All-Africa Games
20th-century Algerian people